The Tiwaka River is a river of northeastern New Caledonia. It contains the Massif de Tchingou.

See also
List of rivers of New Caledonia

References

Rivers of New Caledonia